BattleBots (logo: Bꓭ) is an American robot combat television series. The show was an adaptation of the British TV program Robot Wars, in which competitors design and operate remote-controlled armed and armored machines designed to fight in an arena combat elimination tournament.  For five seasons, BattleBots aired on the American Comedy Central and was hosted by Bil Dwyer, Sean Salisbury, and Tim Green. Comedy Central's first season premiered on August 23, 2000, and its fifth and last season ended on December 21, 2002. The show was on hiatus until it was revived on ABC in 2015.

A six-episode revival series premiered on ABC on June 21, 2015, to generally favorable reviews and ratings.  Additionally, ABC renewed BattleBots for a seventh season, which premiered on June 23, 2016.

In February 2018, Discovery Channel and Science picked up the show for an eighth season, which premiered on May 11, 2018. A ninth season of BattleBots premiered on Discovery Channel on June 7, 2019, the tenth season premiered on December 3, 2020. and the eleventh season on January 6, 2022.

On December 3, 2020, it was announced that a spin-off titled BattleBots: Bounty Hunters would be produced. That spinoff premiered on January 4, 2021 on Discovery+.

A second spin-off premiered on August 5, 2022, under the name BattleBots: Champions where bots fight to gain a slot in an eight-robot competition that combines former and current Battlebots champions with the winners of BattleBots: Champions episodes.

History
BattleBots is an offshoot of the original version Robot Wars, the brainchild of Marc Thorpe. Robot Wars had financial backing from Sm:)e communications, a New York record company. The Thorpe partnership broke up in 1997, starting many years of legal wrangling between Thorpe and Profile Records (the former Sm:)e Communications). Profile licensed Robot Wars to a UK production company and Robot Wars ran for seven years as a popular television program in the UK, before being revived for 2016.

The robot builders left behind in San Francisco formed BattleBots, Inc. and began a series of competitions. The first was held in Long Beach, California in August 1999 and streamed online, attracting 40,000 streams. Lenny Stucker, a television producer known for his work on telecasts of professional boxing, was in attendance and showed interest in being involved with BattleBots—believing the concept of robot combat was "hip" and have shown an interest in technology. Stucker made changes to the competition's format and presentation to make it more suitable for television, including elements reminiscent of boxing (such as a red and blue corner) and shifting to a single-elimination format. The creators tried selling the competition as a television series to networks such as CBS, NBC, HBO, and Showtime—but they failed to understand the concept of the program or take it seriously. A second event was held as a pay-per-view in Las Vegas in 1999, the PPV was in turn, used as a pilot to pitch the show again, with a higher rate of success.

Among the networks interested was Comedy Central, who ultimately picked up the program. Debbie Liebling, the network's Senior Vice President of original programming and development, felt that the concept would appeal to the network's young adult demographic, explaining that "it was really funny and really nerdy. The Internet was not a big thing yet, so the nerd culture wasn't so celebrated. It was sports for the nerdy person, I guess." Co-creator Greg Munson viewed the deal as a double-edged sword; it gave BattleBots an outlet and a larger budget, but the network insisted on the addition of comedic aspects to BattleBots as a program, such as sketches involving contestants. However, the competition itself was not affected by this mandate; Liebling described the final product as being "a parody of a sports show without being a parody". Munson lamented that the network had also ignored his suggestion for the co-host role to be filled by "attractive geek girls" with sufficient knowledge to speak with builders, having elected to "[keep] throwing bigger and better hot babes at it", such as Carmen Electra.

Despite this, viewership and awareness of BattleBots grew progressively over time; contestants Christian Carlberg and Lisa Winter were invited to appear on The Tonight Show with Jay Leno, BattleBots beat South Park as Comedy Central's highest-rated program for a period during Season 3, competitor interest grew and licensing deals also emerged. The success of BattleBots, however, resulted in competition from other broadcasters; TLC introduced a competing program, Robotica, while other channels imported episodes of the British Robot Wars series. By 2002, the program had begun to face further difficulties; Munson felt that the bouts had become "homogenized" because the participants had "perfected" the sport of robot fighting, leading to a lack of innovation in robot designs and strategies. Furthermore, BattleBots had sued Anheuser-Busch and its advertising agency for producing and airing a commercial during Super Bowl XXXVII that parodied the program and featured a robot greatly resembling one from BattleBots (this lawsuit, however, was dismissed in 2004, after a judge ruled that the ad was a parody protected by fair use). In September 2002, Comedy Central cancelled BattleBots after its fifth season, BattleBots 5.0. Viacom acquired full control of the network in April 2003; Stucker believed that Comedy Central had become "tired" of the program, and Roski stated that Viacom had wanted to shift Comedy Central back towards traditional comedy programming.

Between the 21st and 26 August 2009 a BattleBots event was held and filmed in California. Three competitions were held The High School Championship, Collegiate Championship and Pro Championship. Competitors included a mix of Comedy Central and Reboot stars. CBS sport originally agreed to air the Collegiate Championship before dropping out due to lack of commercial interest. A deal with Fox was later signed before also falling apart for unknown reasons. The pilot episode of the Collegiate Championship was released onto the official BattleBots Youtube Channel on the 17th of September 2010.

In December 2014, ABC announced that it had picked up a six-episode revival of BattleBots, produced by Whalerock Industries, to premiere in June 2015. Roski and Munson served as executive producers, joined by Lloyd Braun. The revival drew an average viewership of 5.4 million in its Sunday-night timeslot, with a 1.9 share in the 18-49 demographic. In November 2015, ABC announced that it had renewed the BattleBots revival for a second season, which expanded the competition to a 56-team field.

After ABC declined to renew the revival for a third season, the series was picked up by Discovery Channel and sister network Science. On April 18, 2018, Discovery and Science Channel announced that a new season would begin on Friday, May 11, 2018, at 8:00 p.m. ET/PT on Discovery Channel and Wednesday, May 16, 2018, at 9:00 p.m. ET/PT on Science Channel. The announcement reported that amongst the returning bots would be favorites Tombstone, Minotaur, Chomp, Witch Doctor, Bronco, Bombshell, Bite Force, and Yeti. Chris Rose and Kenny Florian return to call the action, provide background information about the bots and teams, and offer commentary. Jessica Chobot served again as the sideline reporter. Faruq Tauheed returned as the ring announcer.
BattleBots was then brought back for another season on June 5, 2019, on Discovery and Science Channel. Chris Rose and Kenny Florian returned as hosts with a new sideline reporter, Jenny Taft, interviewing all of the BattleBots competitors in the workshop. A tenth season was set to premiere on Discovery on May 15, 2020; however, due to the ongoing coronavirus pandemic, it was pushed to December 3, 2020. Filming began on October 10 and ended on October 21.

Personalities
For the first five seasons, BattleBots was hosted by Bil Dwyer, Sean Salisbury, and Tim Green. Correspondents included former Baywatch actresses Donna D'Errico, Carmen Electra, and Traci Bingham, former Playboy Playmate Heidi Mark, comedian Arj Barker and identical twins Randy and Jason Sklar. Bill Nye was the show's "technical expert". The show's match announcer was longtime boxing ring announcer Mark Beiro.

The 2015 edition was hosted by Molly McGrath, with Chris Rose and former UFC fighting legend Kenny Florian as commentators. The battle arena announcer was Faruq Tauheed, and Alison Haislip conducted interviews on the sidelines and behind the scenes. The judges were engineer and NASA astronaut Leland Melvin, Nerdist News anchor Jessica Chobot and visual effects artist, and former competitor, Fon Davis.

For the 2016 season, Samantha Ponder was added as host, replacing Molly McGrath. The returning judges were Fon Davis, Jessica Chobot, and Leland Melvin, as well as celebrity guest judges actor Clark Gregg, MythBusters host and former Battlebots builder Adam Savage, NFL tightend Vernon Davis, and YouTube star Michael Stevens a.k.a. Vsauce.

For the 2018 season, Rose, Florian, and Tauheed all returned in their roles, with Rose and Florian taking over as the primary hosts of the show. Chobot and Haislip switched their roles, with Chobot becoming the new sideline reporter and Haislip one of the rotating judges. Other judges include former Battlebots competitors Lisa Winter, Derek Young, Grant Imahara and Mark Setrakian.

For the 2019 season, Chobot was replaced with Jenny Taft as a sideline reporter, and the judging panel was fixed to Winter, Young, and former competitor Jason Bardis instead of rotating as it had done in previous seasons.

For the 2020 season, former builder Peter Abrahamson was added as a ringside "bot whisperer" who provided technical details and in-depth analysis of matchups, robots, and damage.
 Jamie Hyneman and Adam Savage (creators of heavyweight Blendo), and Grant Imahara (creator of middleweight Deadblow) of Discovery Channel's MythBusters are former competitors. Deadblow sometimes appeared as a "guest MythBuster", assisting Grant with various experiments including "Driving In The Dark".
 Will Wright, the creator of SimCity and other Sim games, as well as Spore, was a long-time contestant. He competed with middleweight Chiabot in Seasons 1–5, multibot RACC along with Mike Winter in Long Beach 1999, and lightweight The Aggressive Polygon in Season 1. His daughter Cassidy competed with middleweight Misty the WonderBot in Seasons 4–5.
 Michael Loren Mauldin, founder of Lycos, entered multiple bots over the series, competing with Team Toad.
 One of the founders of BattleBots, Trey Roski, is the son of Edward Roski Jr., one of the owners of the STAPLES Center sports arena in Los Angeles.
 Jay Leno appeared with a novelty BattleBot, Chinkilla – a lift-type robot, Chinkilla did not comply with the competition rules and only competed in special exhibition matches at BattleBots events.
 Mark Setrakian, builder/creator of the fighting robots and control suits used on Robot Combat League, is known for his visually appealing robots such as Mechadon and Snake. He has also worked on control technology used for films like Men In Black, The Grinch, and Hellboy. Whilst Setrakian did not compete in the ABC revival series, he built Axis, a claw-like podium that rotated the Giant Nut on top of it while it was on display.
 Gary Coleman, in promotion with UGO.com, joined Jim Smentowski on Team Nightmare for BattleBots Season 5.
 Dan Barry, retired NASA astronaut and Survivor: Panama contestant, competed in BattleBots Season 7 with Black Ice.

Format

Weight classes
Robots at BattleBots tournaments were separated into four weight classes in seasons 1–5. The weight limits increased slightly over time. At the final tournaments the classes were:

Lightweight – 60 pounds (27 kilograms)
Middleweight – 120 pounds (54 kilograms)
Heavyweight – 220 pounds (100 kilograms)
Superheavyweight – 340 pounds (154 kilograms)

Starting in season 6, there were no longer separate weight classes while the weight limit for heavyweights was increased from 220 to 250 pounds.

"Walking" robots (stompbots) propelled by means other than wheels were initially given a 50% weight bonus. The rules changed following the victory of a heavyweight stompbot (Son of Whyachi) at BattleBots 3.0. For BattleBots 4.0 and beyond only a 20% weight bonus was given to walkers and the technical rules specified that walking mechanisms do not use cam operated walking mechanisms as they were functionally too similar to wheel operation. Since the rules change, walking robots have entered the competition, but none has achieved any success beyond preliminary rounds. As of 2020, true walkers are given a 100% weight bonus, allowing the only competing walker, Chomp, to weigh 500 pounds.

Matches
Matches are three minutes long. During a match, two robots do their best to destroy or disable each other using whatever means available. The match begins with a series of lights that flash from yellow to green. The original Comedy Central version used a standard Christmas tree as seen in the sport of drag racing; the ABC revival uses just one box of lights that flash yellow three times, and then flash green.

There are only two events that cause the match to be paused resulting in people entering the BattleBox. One is the event that the robots are stuck together and cannot separate or that both have simultaneously become immobilized. The other scenario is that one or both bots have caught on fire. In that case, the people entering the BattleBox are equipped with fire extinguishers.

If a robot grabs an opposing robot by any means, the grabber robot can hold the defender for up to 30 seconds before the grabber needs to release the defender.

If a robot is unable to move for ten seconds, because it is too badly damaged or it is stuck in some manner (e.g. ensnared in an arena-trap), it is declared knocked out. In the Comedy Central version, the driver could also call a "tap-out" to forfeit the match if his or her robot is about to be destroyed. This ends the match ten seconds later; the opposing driver is "asked" (but not instructed) not to attack during the ten-second count.

If both robots survive the three minutes, three judges distribute a total of 45 points (15 points a judge, 5 points per judge per category) over three categories. The robot with the higher score wins. The judging categories are Aggression, Strategy, and Damage. In Season 6 (June/July 2015), the judging categories were Aggression, Damage, Strategy, and Control. A robot who hangs back safely from its opponent will not get many Aggression points; one in there fighting the whole time, however, will. The Strategy category is about how well a robot exploits its opponent's weaknesses, protects its own, and handles the hazards. A robot driving over the kill saws will lose points here unless it had good reason to do so, while a robot that is able to attack its opponent's weak areas will gain points. The Damage category is for how much damage the bot can deal to its opponent while remaining intact itself.

At the end of the tournament, a series of 'rumbles' or 'melee rounds' is typically held in each weight class, allowing robots that survived the main tournament to fight in a 'free for all' in a 5-minute match. Occasionally there are too many robots for one rumble, and multiple rumbles are held with the top surviving bots competing in a final event.
During the Season 5 Heavyweight rumble (the first rumble of that competition), a sheared-off robot part went through the Lexan arena roof and fell (harmlessly) into the audience. Because of this, the rest of the rumbles were canceled due to safety concerns.

Arena
The BattleBox is a 48' x 48' square arena designed to protect the drivers, officials, and audience from flying debris and charging bots. It was originally designed by Pete Lampertson. As of the 2015 season, Pete was still overseeing the box with the help of Matt Neubauer. It has a steel floor and steel-framed walls and roof paneled with thick, bulletproof polycarbonate plastic. The teams bring their robots in through doorways, which are sealed after all humans have exited. The drivers control their machines from outside the sealed arena.

Arena booby-traps are intended to make fights more interesting and unpredictable and to reward drivers who can avoid the traps while pushing or carrying their opponent into them. Traps from the first five seasons include (and where noted, omitted for the later ABC/Discovery/Science Channel-shown seasons):

Pulverizers: Originally pneumatic powered standard sledgehammers that did minimal damage, the Pulverizers were first upgraded to 50-pound aluminum mallets for season 2, and were again upgraded to 150-pound mallets for season 3 and beyond, now with one near each corner. The pulverizers were capable of causing serious damage, making lighter weight class robots vulnerable.
Spike Strips: The lower walls of the arena are lined with inward-pointing 6-inch long sharpened steel spikes. Pushing an opponent hard into a wall may lodge it in the spikes, immobilizing it.
Spinners: Large, rapidly spinning discs embedded in the arena floor, Not intended to damage a robot, but rather to interfere with navigation. The spinners could fling lighter class robots across the arena, but the impact on heavier robots was minimal. Omitted for the ABC/Discovery/Science Channel-shown seasons. 
Kill Saws: Spinning circular saw saw-blades comprising eight twin-blade hazards, that rise out of slots in the arena floor that was originally under the control of "Pulverizer Pete". These carbide-tipped saw blades can damage a robot's tires or chassis. In later seasons, red 'throwing blades' were added to increase the chance of a bot being thrown across the arena.
Pistons: Introduced in Season 3, the Pistons are steel columns that raise and lower from the floor without warning. They can stop a charging robot or tip a slow-moving robot onto its side. The Pistons were removed for Seasons 4 and 5, and omitted for the ABC/Discovery/Science Channel-shown seasons.
Ramrods: Sharpened steel spikes that rise up out of the arena floor in groups of six, serving either to lift a robot off the ground or damage vulnerable portions of the undercarriage. Omitted for the ABC/Discovery/Science Channel-shown seasons. 
Hell Raisers: A pneumatic ram that can tilt up specific sections of the arena floor. The 15-degree tilt may become a launching ramp, or may abruptly block passage. The Hell Raisers were removed for Season 5 onwards, to allow more uncluttered room for the robots.
Screws: Introduced for season 3, these devices were a modification to the static spike strips. The screws were continually rotating augers placed horizontally along the edges of the arena floor. The Screws were intended to scrape up a bot, and possibly drag it closer to the Pulverizers due to the corkscrew design. Much like the Spinners, the Screws had a greater effect on the lighter weight classes—although their impact on all weight classes was small. For Season 5 onwards, the screws were upgraded with biting 'teeth' to better catch onto robots. Their rotation was also modified so that instead of 'pushing' in one direction, they converged in the center of themselves from opposite directions and created a 'V' that could damage or turn over robots.
The Shelf: Introduced in season 10, the Shelf (also known as the Upper Deck) is a raised platform within the arena upon which robots could be lifted or flipped onto to potentially strand or high-center them. Its presence also created two "short corners" in the arena which present a driving challenge to escape for robots pushed into them. If a robot lands on the Shelf, the robot has 20 seconds to escape before it is declared immobile, indicated by a row of lights that flash red when a robot lands on the hazard. To make escape from the hazard even more difficult, some edges of the hazard have tall walls.

Prizes 

Beside the Giant Nut trophy awarded to the winning team of the championship tournament, there are cash prizes for all Robots that compete in combat at the Tournament. In the second season of the ABC revival series, the winner of the championship tournament finals was awarded a cash prize of US$. During Season 10, the prize was US$.

Additionally, the Giant Bolt trophies are awarded to teams based on their robot’s design and operation, regardless of their performance in the tournament. The awarded categories are: Most Destructive Robot, Best Designer, and Founder’s Award.  Following the death of longtime competitor Grant Imahara in 2020, the Best Designer award was renamed to the Grant Imahara Award for Best Design in his honor.

Episodes

BattleBots: Bounty Hunters

On December 3, 2020, it was announced that a spin-off titled BattleBots: Bounty Hunters was released. The streaming series premiered on January 4, 2021 on Discovery+.

BattleBots: Bounty Hunters features veteran bots who have dominated all past challengers. For the first time ever, the series places a "bounty" on some of the heads of the 'most lethal, most destructive, and the most ruthless bots'. A group of the best builders step forward to defend their title. With six elite tournaments and US$ on the line, the newcomers only have one shot to take down a legendary bot.

BattleBots: Champions
On July 19, 2022, it was announced that a spin-off titled BattleBots: Champions was released. The streaming series premiered on August 4, 2022 on Discovery+.

See also

Robot Fighting League
Survival Research Laboratories
RoboGames
Robot Wars (TV series)

Notes

References

External links

(Comedy Central version)
(ABC version)
(Science Channel version)
Full results of major robotic competitions including Robot Wars, BattleBots and Robotica

2000 American television series debuts
2002 American television series endings
2015 American television series debuts
2018 American television series debuts
American Broadcasting Company original programming
American television series revived after cancellation
 
Comedy Central game shows
Companies based in Marin County, California
Discovery Channel original programming
Robot combat competitions
Robotics competitions
Science Channel original programming
Sports entertainment
Television series about robots